René Morel may refer to:

 René A. Morel (1932–2011), luthier
 René Morel (athlete) (1912–1978), French middle-distance runner
 René Morel (Légion étrangère) (1908–1974), French Army officer